Flintshire was a parliamentary constituency in North-East Wales which generally returned one Member of Parliament (MP) to the House of Commons, latterly that of the Parliament of the United Kingdom, from 1542 until it was abolished for the 1950 general election.

Boundaries 
From its creation in 1542 until 1918, the constituency consisted of the historic county of Flintshire in north-east Wales. The seat should not be confused with the borough constituency of Flint or that of Flint Boroughs, which together existed from the 16th century until 1918.

In 1889 an administrative county of Flintshire was created. This formed the basis of the constituency which existed from 1918 until 1950, when the county was split between East and West divisions.

Members of Parliament

Before 1604

1604–1950

Elections

Elections in the 1830s

Elections in the 1840s

Following the election, Lloyd-Mostyn's election was declared void and Glynne was elected after scrutiny on 23 May 1842.

Elections in the 1850s

Lloyd-Mostyn succeeded to the peerage, becoming 2nd Baron Mostyn and causing a by-election.

Elections in the 1860s
Mostyn's death caused a by-election.

Elections in the 1870s
Grosvenor was appointed Vice-Chamberlain of the Household, requiring a by-election.

Elections in the 1880s 

Grosvenor's resignation caused a by-election.

Elections in the 1890s

Elections in the 1900s

Elections in the 1910s 

General Election 1914–15:
Another General Election was due to take place before the end of 1915. From 1914, the parties had been making preparations for an election, and by the end of that year, the following candidates had been selected: 
Liberal: Herbert Lewis
Unionist: D. F. Pennant
The constituency was then merged with Flint Boroughs.

Elections in the 1920s

Elections in the 1930s

Elections in the 1940s 
General Election 1939–40:
Another General Election was due to take place before the end of 1940. From 1939 the parties had been preparing for an election, and by the end of that year, the following candidates had been selected: 
Conservative: Gwilym Rowlands
Liberal: Mostyn Lewis
Labour: WJ Rees

Notes

References 

W R Williams The Parliamentary History of the Principality of Wales

Further reading

History of Flintshire
Historic parliamentary constituencies in North Wales
Constituencies of the Parliament of the United Kingdom established in 1542
Constituencies of the Parliament of the United Kingdom disestablished in 1950